Tartamella is a surname. Notable people with the surname include:

Joe Tartamella (born 1980), American college basketball coach
John Tartamella (1892–1966), American mobster
Travis Tartamella (born 1987), American baseball catcher